The 2008 Vuelta a Andalucía was the 54th edition of the Vuelta a Andalucía cycle race and was held on 17 February to 21 February 2008. The race started in Benahavís and finished in Córdoba. The race was won by Pablo Lastras.

General classification

References

Vuelta a Andalucia
Vuelta a Andalucía by year
2008 in Spanish sport